Goldington is an area of Bedford and electoral ward in the unparished area of Bedford, in the Bedford district, in the ceremonial county of Bedfordshire, England. It encompasses much of the historic village and parish of Goldington that was merged with Bedford in 1934, although some parts of the old village are within the neighbouring Newnham ward. It also includes two modern estates that are part of Renhold parish.

The boundaries of Goldington are approximately The Spires and Aspire estates to the north, Norse Road to the east, Goldington Road to the south, with Church Lane and Bow Hill to the west. The northern part of the area is sometimes known as Elms Farm.

History
Goldington was a village which grew up along the old A428 road between Bedford and Cambridge. St Mary's Church in Goldington has parish registers going back to 1559.

In August 1645 Major Walter Baskerville, a Royalist cavalry Officer, was killed in a skirmish in Goldington. Goldington Hall (a small mansion) was built in the 1650s. The Hall was rebuilt in 1874.

In 1931 the parish had a population of 1440. On 1 April 1934 the parish was abolished with the southern part of the merged with Bedford and the northern rural parts becoming part of Ravensden and Renhold. The area was greatly expanded to the north in the 1960s and 70s, seeing the return of some of the original parish lost in 1934. This expansion included the development of the Elms Farm estate and the Church Lane shopping parade. The Poppyfields estate was developed in the area in the 1990s.

In the 21st century The Spires and Aspire housing estates have been constructed on the northern boundary of Goldington. These newer estates are in the civil parish of Renhold.

After many years as a pub, the old Goldington Hall became semi-derelict and was the scene of a small fire in 2008. It is now a private residence.

Coplan Estates were appointed to re-develop the Church Lane shopping area in 2006, and an old pub called The Century was demolished in 2008. However the recession of the late 2000s delayed further progress. Phase one of the regeneration saw the Aldi supermarket being constructed at the site and this opened in summer 2010. An Iceland supermarket and medical centre were opened in 2015, with the Church Lane Community Centre refurbished in 2016.

The Queens Tavern pub on Queens Drive was closed in 2017 and replaced with a Co-op Food store.

Goldington Castle, a motte-and-bailey castle, was built sometime after 1066, but is not actually in Goldington despite its name. The castle is located in the neighbouring area of Newnham.

Governance
The majority of Goldington is an unparished area, with all community services under the direct control of Bedford Borough Council. Goldington elects two councillors to Bedford Borough Council.  The seats were won in 2015 by Anthony Forth and Jade Uko of the Labour Party.  The Spires and Aspire estates are in the area covered by Renhold Parish Council to which they elect one councillor, at a by-election in 2018 Labour councillor Darren Rayner was elected unopposed.

Economy
There are three shopping parades in Goldington at which most shops and services are located -

The first is Goldington Square on Church Lane which includes an Aldi supermarket, a branch of Iceland, a Co-op store and post office, a hairdressers, a fish & chip shop, a bookmakers, a branch of Subway, a medical centre and a community centre.

Goldington's second shopping hub is on Queens Drive, which has a small convenience store, a post office, a chemist, a hairdresser, a butcher's shop, a laundrette, a Co-op convenience store, a fish & chip shop, petrol station and GP Surgery.

There is a small shopping parade on The Fairway with a convenience store, The Sportsman pub and a butchers shop.  A greengrocer and fish and chip shop have closed and now stand empty.

There are still a few shops and pubs along the old village High Street (i.e. Goldington Road) including a small Londis supermarket. There is a small independent supermarket on Elliot Crescent.

To the eastern side of Goldington is the Elms & Viking Industrial estate. This large business park (between Goldington Road and Norse Road) houses many firms, including Enterprise Holdings, E.ON UK, GE Healthcare and the East of England Ambulance Service.

Education
Since the alteration of ward boundaries in 2011, and the relocation of Putnoe Primary School, there are no schools within the ward. The ward is served by Putnoe Primary School, The Hills Academy, Goldington Green Academy and Renhold VC Primary School for primary school age pupils. Goldington Academy and Mark Rutherford School serve the area for secondary school age pupils.

Religious sites
St Mary's Church (Church of England) is a grade II* listed building, located on Church Lane

Community facilities
Church Lane Community Centre is located on Goldington Square, Church Lane. Goldington Green is the area's largest open space, and is situated on Church Lane and Goldington Road. Goldington Bury cricket ground is situated next to Goldington Green. Goldington Bury is the home ground of Bedford Cricket Club.

References

External links

 Goldington timeline

Areas of Bedford
Former civil parishes in Bedfordshire